Wesley Township is one of the twenty-two townships of Washington County, Ohio, United States.  The 2000 census found 915 people in the township.

Geography
Located in the far western part of the county, it borders the following townships:
Windsor Township, Morgan County - north
Palmer Township - northeast
Fairfield Township - southeast
Decatur Township - south
Rome Township, Athens County - southwest corner
Bern Township, Athens County - west
Marion Township, Morgan County - northwest

No municipalities are located in Wesley Township, although the unincorporated community of Bartlett lies in the township's center.

Name and history
It is the only Wesley Township statewide.

Government
The township is governed by a three-member board of trustees, who are elected in November of odd-numbered years to a four-year term beginning on the following January 1. Two are elected in the year after the presidential election and one is elected in the year before it. There is also an elected township fiscal officer, who serves a four-year term beginning on April 1 of the year after the election, which is held in November of the year before the presidential election. Vacancies in the fiscal officership or on the board of trustees are filled by the remaining trustees.

References

External links
County website

Townships in Washington County, Ohio
Townships in Ohio